Vaibhav Prem Rawal (born 9 November 1991) is an Indian cricketer who plays for Delhi in domestic cricket. He is a left-hand batsman and leg-break bowler. He is a member of the Kolkata Knight Riders squad in the Indian Premier League. He made his List A debut for Delhi on 8 January 2013 against England XI.

He completed his schooling from Delhi Public School, Delhi and his graduation from The Hindu College, Delhi.

References

External links 

Living people
Indian cricketers
Delhi cricketers
1991 births